Qabtar Qoluy-e Olya (also Romanized as Qabţar Qolūy-e ‘Olyā; also known as ‘Eyshūm Do, Ghebté Gholooé Dovom, Qabţaqolū, Qabţar Qolū-ye ‘Olyā, Qeydar Qalū-ye Bālā, and Qeydar Qalū-ye ‘Olyā) is a village in Zarqan Rural District, Zarqan District, Shiraz County, Fars Province, Iran. At the 2006 census, its population was 26, in 7 families.

References 

Populated places in Zarqan County